A cookie table is a wedding tradition where in addition to a wedding cake, a large table with different cookies is presented to guests at the wedding reception. Cookies are generally prepared by family members in advance of the reception. It is typically a  tradition in Pittsburgh, Pennsylvania, and Youngstown, Ohio.

Cookie tables are included in primarily Italian, Polish or Catholic wedding receptions. Other groups that also have cookie tables or cookie platters are the Greeks, Slovaks, Serbian Orthodox, Austrian/Hungarian, and Scandinavians. The inclusion of a cookie table is more widely known where those of Italian ancestry settled, and also in some cases, of the other groups mentioned above. Where a settlement did not consist of sizable numbers of Italian or Eastern European groups, the number of those who were familiar with cookie tables decreased. Cookie tables were better known in the east than in the mid-west, south, southwest or west.

Research by the Arms Family Museum of Local History in Youngstown discovered the dominant areas for cookie tables were northeastern Ohio and western Pennsylvania, including New Castle, Pennsylvania. Cookie tables were also well known in West Virginia, Virginia, New York, New Jersey and Delaware. States where they were unknown or not present included Washington, California, Texas and Nevada.

The world record for the largest cookie table was set on August 11, 2019 in Monongahela, Pennsylvania with 88,425 cookies.

References 

Culture of Pittsburgh
Italian-American culture
Wedding traditions
Cookies